Rishika Sunkara (born 14 May 1993) is an Indian tennis player.

In her career, she has won 12 titles on the ITF Circuit; two in singles and ten in doubles (four in 2015 of which three were won with Sowjanya Bavisetti). On 9 November 2015, she reached her career-high singles ranking of world No. 441. On 5 August 2013, she peaked at No. 375 in the doubles rankings.

She competed for the India Fed Cup team in 2013 and 2014. Rishika has a rare distinction of being the junior and pro number one in India while still being a teenager.

Playing for India in Fed Cup, Sunkara has a win–loss record of 2–3.

Early career
Rishika Sunkara was born on 14 May 1993 in Vijayawada, Andhra Pradesh. She has an elder brother who used to play tennis, and she started playing tennis at the age of six. One of her earliest coaches was Mahesh Kumbria in Cosmic.

Rishika Sunkara teamed up with Sai Samhitha for doubles final in National Hard Court Tennis, in 2021. 

Sunkara was part of the Team Tennis Academy under coach Aditya Sachdev for nine years till the split in 2016. She is currently coached by Anantha Bhaskar. Rishika is sponsored by Head. In the past, she was supported by GVK and Adidas.

ITF Circuit finals

Singles: 6 (2 titles, 4 runner-ups)

Doubles: 23 (10–13)

References

External links
 
 
 

1993 births
Living people
Indian female tennis players
Tennis players at the 2014 Asian Games
Racket sportspeople from Vijayawada
Sportswomen from Vijayawada, India
21st-century Indian women
21st-century Indian people
Asian Games competitors for India
South Asian Games silver medalists for India
South Asian Games medalists in tennis